Donald Waldhaus (March 31, 1895 – April 17, 1975) was an American fencer. He competed in the team épée event at the 1924 Summer Olympics.

References

External links
 

1895 births
1975 deaths
American male épée fencers
Olympic fencers of the United States
Fencers at the 1924 Summer Olympics
Sportspeople from Bridgeport, Connecticut